Ann Jansson (born 1 July 1958) is a Swedish former racewalking athlete.

Career
She represented her country at the World Championships in Athletics, IAAF World Indoor Championships and six times at the IAAF World Race Walking Cup. She was a medallist at the European Athletics Championships in 1986.

She was a pioneer in the early period of international women's walking and broke several European records. Her 10 kilometres race walk time of 47:58.2 minutes in 1981 was the first ever ratified by the European Athletics Association and she improved this to 47:49.3 the following year, and twice more to 46:14.3 in 1985 and 46:13.2 in 1986. Her record was beaten that same year by Soviet walker Aleksandra Grigoryeva. Her 20 kilometres race walk time of 1:36:37 in 1985 was the best ever recorded by a European woman, though the woman's event was not an officially recognised one at that point. In world rankings, she was the world's number one 10 km walker in 1981, having been the second best to Briton Carol Tyson a year earlier.

In international competition, her greatest achievement was a silver medal in the 10 km walk at the 1986 European Athletics Championships, finishing behind Spain's Mari Cruz Díaz in the first ever women's European Championships event in walking. The following year she took part in the first World Championships event and was eleventh in the women's 10 km walk. She was also a competitor in the first major women's indoor walking races, coming fifth at the 1985 IAAF World Indoor Games, sixth at the 1987 IAAF World Indoor Championships and seventh at the 1988 European Athletics Indoor Championships. She raced at six consecutive edition of the IAAF World Race Walking Cup from 1979 to 1989, with her best finish being fifth in 1981. She was twice a team silver medallist with Sweden at that event.

Jansson was a dominant figure at national level. At the Swedish Athletics Championships she was a twenty-time national champion. She won the 3000 m title from 1979 to 1986 (interrupted once by Britt Holmquist in 1980), won six 5000 m titles from 1980 to 1987 (losing twice to Siv Gustafsson) and won seven 10 km road titles from 1980 to 1987 (losing to Gustafsson in 1984). At regional level, she was a five-time champion at the Nordic Race Walking Championships (three in 5 km, twice in 10 km).

Jansson was twice winner at the prestigious annual Coppa Città di Sesto San Giovanni meet.

Personal bests
3000 metres race walk – 13:04.29 min (1987)
5 kilometres race walk – 23:08 min (1987)
10 kilometres race walk – 45:24 min (1987)
20 kilometres race walk – 1:34:59 min (1987)

International competitions

National titles
Swedish Athletics Championships
3000 m walk: 1979, 1981, 1982, 1983, 1984, 1985, 1986
5000 m walk: 1980, 1982, 1984, 1985, 1986, 1987
10 km walk: 1980, 1981, 1982, 1983, 1985, 1986, 1987

References

External links

Living people
1958 births
Swedish female racewalkers
World Athletics Championships athletes for Sweden
European Athletics Championships medalists